The Restinga de Cabedelo National Forest is a national forest in the state of Paraíba, Brazil.

Location

The Restinga de Cabedelo National Forest is divided between the municipalities of Cabedelo (79%) and João Pessoa (215) in the state of Paraíba.
It is in the João Pessoa metropolitan region.
The conservation unit is popularly called the AMEM Forest.
It is administered by the federal Chico Mendes Institute for Biodiversity Conservation (ICMBio).

History

It is classed as IUCN protected area category VI (protected area with sustainable use of natural resources).
The purpose is sustainable use of forest resources, and scientific research with emphasis on methods for sustainable exploitation of native forests.
By ordinance 11 of 16 March 2009 the president of ICMBio created the consultative council, with the goal of helping to create and implement the management plan.
The management plan was approved by ordinance 76 of 13 February 2017.

Environment

The Restinga de Cabedelo National Forest holds one of the last fragments of Atlantic Forest restinga vegetation in Paraíba.
Vegetation includes Atlantic forest with areas of mangrove, restinga fields and restinga forest.

Public use

In 2000 it was reported that the people of the adjoining Renascer bairro often used the forest for fruit, firewood, herbs and plants for food and medicine.
32 research projects were authorized between 2008 and 2013. 
Due to low staff levels, the forest has not been used for educational purposes.
There are no facilities for visitors such as a visitor center, shops and cafeteria.
There is an auditorium for 50 people, accessible bathrooms and covered parking.

Problems include illegal fishing, practice of religious rituals, drug use, theft and other crimes.
Conflicting uses include the AMEM shelter for the elderly, wild animal screening center, and the highway, railway, gas pipeline and electrical power lines that adjoins or cross the forest.

Notes

Sources

National forests of Brazil
Protected areas established in 2004
2004 establishments in Brazil
Protected areas of Paraíba